Pitbull's Globalization Radio is a Sirius XM Radio station playing current rhythmic/dance hits from around the globe. The channel, which is co-owned by American entertainer Pitbull and named after his 2014 album Globalization, was launched on May 19, 2015.

Details
The channel's concept was inspired by Pitbull's musical influences and his love for rhythmic, R&B, hip hop, dance/EDM, and dance/pop hits from international acts. The combination of these elements, along with Pitbull's musical catalog, mix shows, and live sets, make up the core basis of the format. The playlist and presentation serves as a bridge between the rhythmic pop-focused Venus and the dance-intensive BPM. The channel is a rhythmic reporter in Mediabase, which added the station to its panel in October 2015. In order to make room for the channel, Sirius XM moved the 40s On 4 to channel 73, re-launching as 40s Junction.

To help celebrate the launch, the artist kicked off the debut with a live show at New York City's Apollo Theater on May 19, 2015.

In 2017, the station had its number moved from 4 to 13 to accommodate the new Hallmark Channel. 4 is now used for SoulCycle Radio.

Programming blocks
 Wake Up Mix with Big Syphe
 Old School Hour with DJ Rawn
 Lunch Mix with DJ Santarosa
 Rush Hour Mix with Kidd Spin
 Happy Hour Mix with DJ Impakt
 The Diva Hour Mix with DJ Analuisa & various DJs
 Live from the 305 with DJ Laz
 Global Mix Weekends with Latin Prince, Mistajam and Chris Villa
 Block Party with Crisco Kidd
 DJ Anarchy Tropical Takeover Saturday
 DJ Mark Cutz Friday Morning
 Rebota with DJ Ka5 and DJ Livitup
 Main Stage with Cheyenne Giles
 The Roster Radio with DJ Kaos

References

External links
Sirius XM/Pitbull's Globalization

Sirius XM Radio channels
Rhythmic contemporary radio stations
Dance radio stations
Sirius Satellite Radio channels
XM Satellite Radio channels
Radio stations established in 2015